The Rural Municipality of Saskatchewan is a former rural municipality (RM) in the Canadian province of Manitoba. It was originally incorporated as a rural municipality on December 22, 1883. It ceased on January 1, 2015 as a result of its provincially mandated amalgamation with the RM of Blanshard and the Town of Rapid City to form the Rural Municipality of Oakview.

Communities 
 Basswood
 Riverdale

References

External links
 Map of Saskatchewan R.M. at Statcan

Saskatchewan
Populated places disestablished in 2015
2015 disestablishments in Manitoba